The Pony Club Association of Victoria, commonly abbreviated as PCAV, is the recognised State Sporting Organisation and controlling body for Pony Club in Victoria where young people can ride and learn all disciplines of equestrian sports. The Association co-ordinates, develops and promotes horsemanship in Victoria and instruction for its members.  The Association is a member of Pony Club Australia.

Children and young adults to the age of 25 learn the skills of riding and general horsemanship and compete in local events, but can also go on to compete at state, national and international events. Pony Club is one of the few sports were males and females compete on equal terms.

Victoria is divided into 10 Zones currently comprising 210 Clubs. Each club is organized and arranged separately, but the Zone also has an organizing Committee. Each Zone also has a Chief Instructor whose duty is to supervise and encourage the instruction policy within the Zone. Each Zone sends Councillors to Association meetings to determine general policy.

In each Zone there are as many as 30 different Pony Clubs.

Aims and Objectives
To encourage young people to ride and to learn to enjoy all approved types of sport connected with horses and riding
To provide instruction in horsemanship and riding and to instill in the members the proper care of their animals.
To promote the highest ideals of sportsmanship, citizenship and loyalty, thereby cultivating strength of character and self-discipline.

Membership
Membership is open to anyone. Junior members are under 17 years, Associate members are 17 and under 25 years and Senior Members are 25 years and over. Only Junior and Associate members are allowed to compete or receive instruction and certificates.

Throughout their Pony Club career, riders are encouraged to undertake various efficiency certificates according to their age and ability, commencing with the basic ‘D’ certificate through to ‘A’ certificate which is the highest level. These certificates aim to encourage the interest and improvement in knowledge of its members. They are viewed as a measure of a rider’s progress in their overall efficiency. In working for them riders acquire valuable knowledge and skills, which enhance their riding experience.

Competitions
To supplement Rally Days there are other activities offered such as gymkhanas, camps, trail rides, lectures and films, visits to places of interest and demonstrations.
Inter-club competitions are often held in the form of a Gymkhana, which has a mix of show riding events, Sporting and Showjumping competitions.

Zone championships are generally held once a year for most disciplines, including Dressage, Show Jumping, One Day Eventing, Horse Trials, Sporting, Flat teams, and Mounted Games.

State Championships are held at roughly the same times each year.

Clothing and Uniforms
Each member is required to wear the following at all times, while mounted:

 Well fitting Pony Club approved helmet
 Smooth soled riding boots.  

Each club sets its own uniform. This will generally include an informal uniform for club rally days such as a club polo shirt and a formal uniform, consisting of a long-sleeved shirt, tie, and jumper or vest. Each club will normally have its own saddle cloth.

Each Zone and State also have their own colours and uniforms. Zone representatives in state competitions must wear the Zone's colours.

Examples of club jumper colour schemes
Apollo Bay Pony Club: Royal Blue and Orange.
Portarlington and District Pony Club: Purple with a Yellow Sash
Shepparton Pony Club: Royal Blue with a Light Blue Sash.
Trafalgar Pony Club: Red.

Example: The North Eastern Zone
The North Eastern Zone comprises the Pony Clubs in the North Eastern part of Victoria. There are 17 Pony Clubs in this Zone:

Alexandra & District Pony Club
Benalla Pony Club
Bethanga Pony Club
Bright & District Pony Club
Chiltern & District Pony Club
Euroa Pony Club
Howlong Pony Club
Kergunyah Pony Club 
Mansfield Pony Club
Moyhu Pony Club)
Myrtleford Pony Club 
Numurkah & District Pony Club
Seymour Pony Club 
Shepparton Pony Club 
Wangaratta Pony Club 
Wodonga & District Pony Club 
Yarrawonga Pony Club 

Each of these clubs has its own meeting place, uniforms, shows, rally/training days, sponsors, and committees.

Meeting places
Quite a few Pony Clubs, such as Bacchus Marsh and Sale, use the local showgrounds. Some clubs, such as Werribee, use special horse facilities like the Werribee Park National Equestrian Centre. Other clubs, such as the Dandenong Ranges Horse and Pony Club and Yarra Glen & District Pony Club have their own grounds which either belong to the club or are leased from the Local Council. The Pony Clubs themselves normally pay for the upkeep and maintenance of facilities, although often government grants will supplement club finances such as the 2008 sand arena at Drysdale/Leopold Pony Club.

History
PCAV was formed at a meeting held at the Royal Melbourne Showgrounds on 13 January 1954, with seven affiliated clubs - Berwick, Eltham, Footscray, Mountain District, Shepparton, Vermont and Western District. While Vermont and Footscray have since disbanded, they continue on in their areas as Nunawading District Horse and Pony Club and Truganina Pony Club.

Rapid increase in membership in the 1960s necessitated the formation of Zones (areas) to facilitate administration and organisation. Ultimately 10 Zones were formed - each more or less geographical in concept, with a membership ranging from 10 to 16 Clubs each.

External links
Pony Club Association of Victoria Official Website
www.ponyclubaustralia.com.au Pony Club Australia Official Website]

Notes

Equestrian organizations
Sports governing bodies in Victoria (Australia)